"Holy" is the fifth episode of the second series of British television sitcom Bottom. It was first broadcast on 29 October 1992.

Synopsis
It is Christmas time in Hammersmith once again, and Richie and Eddie experience a Christmas miracle.

Plot
One early Christmas morning, Richie enters Eddie's room disguised as Santa Claus and presents "gifts" for himself and Eddie. He accidentally sets off Eddie's homemade security system, which results in Richie being hanged. After being freed by Eddie, Richie returns as himself and proceeds to list off the gifts that "Santa" has left them, which consist of the ingredients for Christmas dinner, while Eddie himself receives no stocking stuffers. Eddie presents his gifts for Richie: a small empty bottle of Malibu rum, and a used toilet roll made into a "play telescope" featuring an image of Sue Carpenter. Richie presents his gift for Eddie: a childlike-styled self-portrait of Richie which was completed in fifteen minutes.

Later on, Richie forbids Eddie to watch TV until the Queen's Speech comes on (although Richie renders this impossible by pulling out the plug wire) and proceeds to start Christmas dinner. Short on brandy butter, the two settle for the highly-flammable "vodka margarine". During the cooking, Richie accidentally chops off one of his fingers and begins to lose blood. To get on with Christmas dinner, Eddie crudely staples the finger back into place. Dave Hedgehog and Spudgun arrive to attend Christmas dinner and are served glasses of gravy as a replacement for the sherry that Eddie already drank. For lunch, they are served rock hard potatoes, sprouts, and a turkey that is overcooked so much that it has shrunk and is inedible. They skip to the pudding; when Richie set the vodka margarine alight, Eddie is forced to extinguish the powerful blaze. Richie attempts to play charades, but the others do not know the rules. The doorbell rings, and a baby is found on the doorstep. Richie decides that he and Eddie should adopt the child, despite Eddie's protests. Eddie laments "get rid of it" and "why couldn't you be more careful?".

Spudgun, Eddie and Dave decide to give the child gifts; respectively, Terry's All Gold, a Frankenstein mask and an aftershave named "Grrr". At the time, the three are wearing paper crowns and Richie, a virgin, is wearing a blue towel like a veil. Noticing the similarities with the Nativity, Richie believes that he is the Virgin Mother of God, the child is the Messiah and that they are witnessing the Second Coming. Richie gives himself the title "Richard Mary" and demands the servitude of the others. However, it turns out that the baby is Johnny, the grandson of their landlord Mr Harrison, whose daughter returns to collect the boy. Eddie and Richie get excited when she prepares to breastfeed in front of them.

Continuity and production errors
This episode was edited down by five minutes for transmission, producing a number of discontinuities. The original uncut version is now available on the series 2 DVD.
 Richie lights the Christmas pudding and goes up in a blaze. The flames were added via an optical effect, and this is obvious when Richie is moving the pudding, and the flames do not follow. A similar effect was used in the same episode involving a Christmas tree, but was really alight the next shot, despite the flames dying down. In Series 3, this effect was scrapped, and controlled flames were used (see Dough).
 Notably, this is the only episode of the series to have a 'happy' ending with neither Richie or Eddie suffering some form of injury or presumed death.
 In this episode Spudgun tells Eddie and Dave Hedgehog that Emmerdale Farm had changed its title to just Emmerdale, claiming "it doesn't take so long to read" and they can "pack a lot more story in". It is implied that this happened quite recently, although in reality Emmerdale Farm changed its title in November 1989, almost three years before this episode was recorded.

Cast

References

External links
 
 

1992 British television episodes
Bottom (TV series)
British Christmas television episodes